Davis's leaf-toed gecko (Phyllodactylus davisi), also known commonly as Davis' leaf-toed gecko, is a species of lizard in the family Phyllodactylidae. The species is endemic to Mexico.

Etymology
The specific name, davisi, is in honor of American zoologist William Bennoni Davis.

Geographic range
P. davisi is found in western Mexico, in the Mexican states of Colima and Michoacán.

Habitat
The preferred natural habitat of P. davisi is rocky areas within forest.

Behavior
P. davisi is terrestrial and saxicolous (rock-dwelling).

Reproduction
P. davisi is oviparous.

References

Further reading
Dixon JR (1964). "The Systematics and Distribution of Lizards of the Genus Phyllodactylus in North and Central America". New Mexico State University Science Bulletin 64: i–iv, 1–139. (Phyllodactylus davisi, new species, pp. 90–94 + Figure 14 on p. 139).
Lemos-Espinal JA, Smith GR, Pierce LJS, Painter CW (2020). "The amphibians and reptiles of Colima, Mexico, with a summary of their conservation status". Zookeys 927: 99–125.
Méndez-de la Cruz FR, de la Vega-Pérez AH, Lara-Resendiz RA (2014). "Geographic Distribution: Phyllodactylus davisi (Davis's leaf-toed gecko)". Herpetological Review 45 (2): 283.
Rösler H (2000). "Kommentierte Liste der rezent, subrezent und fossil bekannten Geckotaxa (Reptilia: Gekkonomorpha)". Gekkota 2: 28–153. (Phyllodactylus davisi, p. 104). (in German).

Phyllodactylus
Endemic reptiles of Mexico
Reptiles described in 1964